Neoabietadiene synthase (EC 4.2.3.132, AgAS, PtTPS-LAS) is an enzyme with systematic name (+)-copaly-diphosphate diphosphate-lyase (cyclizing, neoabietadiene-forming). This enzyme catalyses the following chemical reaction:

 (+)-copalyl diphosphate  neoabietadiene + diphosphate

This enzyme is isolated from Abies grandis (grand fir).

References

External links 
 

EC 4.2.3